Gérald Jean Caussé (born 20 May 1963) has been the Presiding Bishop of the Church of Jesus Christ of Latter-day Saints (LDS Church) since 9 October 2015. He is the fifteenth man to serve in this position.  He has been a general authority of the LDS Church since 2008 and was the first person from France appointed as a general authority.  

Caussé, who was born in Bordeaux, was raised as a Latter-day Saint: his parents joined the church when he was six months old, having recently moved to France from Algeria. Caussé became the Sunday School president in his branch when he was 16.

Caussé served for a year in the French Air Force. He has a master's degree in business from École supérieure des sciences économiques et commerciales (ESSEC Business School).

Prior to his call as a general authority, Caussé worked for a strategy consulting firm in Paris and London. He later returned to Paris to work for the Carrefour Retail Group. And finally, he was the general manager and a member of the board of Pomona, France's largest food distributor.

LDS Church service
Caussé was president of the LDS Church's Paris France Stake from 2001 to 2007. In April 2007, he became an area seventy in the church's Europe West Area. On 5 April 2008, Caussé became a member of the church's First Quorum of the Seventy. For most of his four years as a member of the First Quorum of the Seventy Caussé served in the presidency of the church's Europe Area.

On 31 March 2012, he was called to serve as the first counselor to Gary E. Stevenson in the Presiding Bishopric.  When Stevenson was called to the Quorum of the Twelve Apostles in October 2015, Caussé succeeded him as the church's Presiding Bishop. Under the direction of the First Presidency, the Presiding Bishopric is tasked with general oversight of many of the church's day-to-day operations. Among other areas of management, this includes the construction and maintenance of church meetinghouse facilities around the world. 

As of August 2017, Caussé serves on the Church Board of Education and Boards of Trustees. Humanitarian aid and charitable giving increased under Caussé's leadership reaching nearly $1 billion per year. In 2020 Caussé addressed the controversy surrounding the LDS Church's investments, managed by Ensign Peak Advisors, "It is a church. It’s not a financial institution...and because it is a church, the funds that are managed within the church are contributed by the members of the church and are really sacred. We really consider those funds as belonging to the Lord."

Music
Gérald Caussé is an accomplished pianist. In 2019, he released an album entitled "Joyful: Piano Duets of Gérald Caussé and Nicolas Giusti" consisting of piano Duo arrangements of popular church hymns. Nicolas Giusti is an acclaimed Italian composer and opera conductor from Rome. This was followed in 2020 with the release of "Noël," a recording of piano Duo arrangements of popular Christmas hymns, again with Nicholas Giusti.

Personal life
Caussé married Valérie Lucienne Babin on 5 August 1986 in the Bern Switzerland Temple. They are the parents of five children : Valentine, Emilie, Adrien, Pauline and Noémie.

References

External links
Gérald Caussé Official profile

1963 births
French general authorities (LDS Church)
Members of the First Quorum of the Seventy (LDS Church)
ESSEC Business School alumni
Clergy from Bordeaux
Area seventies (LDS Church)
Living people
Counselors in the Presiding Bishopric (LDS Church)
Presiding Bishops (LDS Church)